Cynoglossus puncticeps, commonly known as the Speckled tonguesole is a species of tonguefish. It is indigenous to the Indo-West Pacific region, commonly found in shallow muddy or sandy waters along the coast of the Philippines, Thailand and the Malay peninsula, Burma, the Bay of Bengal and off Papua New Guinea and northern Australia.

References
Fishbase

Cynoglossidae
Fish described in 1846